The women's 60 metres hurdles event  at the 1990 European Athletics Indoor Championships was held in the Kelvin Hall on 4 March.

Medalists

Results

Heats
First 2 from each heat (Q) and the next 6 fastest (q) qualified for the semifinals.

Semifinals
First 2 from each semifinal (Q) and the next 2 fastest (q) qualified for the final.

1Since both recorded the  same time and were tied for sixth, Caren Jung and Paraskevi Patoulidou were ordered to run-off for the last spot in the final. Jung won with 8.08 to Patoulidou's 8.12.

Final

References

60 metres hurdles at the European Athletics Indoor Championships
60
1990 in women's athletics